Sydney Bernice Sweeney (born September 12, 1997) is an American actress. She first gained attention for appearing in the television series Everything Sucks! (2018), The Handmaid's Tale (2018), and Sharp Objects (2018). She is also known for her role as Cassie Howard in HBO's Euphoria. In 2019, she was featured in Quentin Tarantino's film Once Upon a Time in Hollywood. 

Sweeney has starred as Cassie Howard in the HBO teen drama series Euphoria since 2019 and played a sardonic teenager in The White Lotus in 2021. For her roles in them, she received two Primetime Emmy Awards nominations in 2022, the former for Outstanding Supporting Actress in a Drama Series and the latter for Outstanding Supporting Actress in a Limited or Anthology Series or Movie. Sweeney is the founder of production company Fifty-Fifty Films, launched in 2020.

Early life
Sydney Bernice Sweeney was born on September 12, 1997, in Spokane, Washington, to Lisa ( Mudd) and Steven Sweeney. Her mother is a lawyer and her father works in the medical field. She has a brother, Trent. Sweeney was raised in northwestern Idaho in the state's Panhandle region along the Washington border, at a rural lakeside home that her family has inhabited for five generations. Sweeney has said she has a "religious family".

Sweeney attended Saint George's School in Spokane. She was active in numerous athletics: "I was in every single sport possible", she said. "I was on the soccer team, the baseball team, the snow slalom ski team, I was wakeboarding." Sweeney also studied multiple languages and graduated with top grades. She became interested in acting after auditioning to be an extra in an independent film that was shooting in the Spokane area. To convince her parents to allow her to pursue acting, she presented them with a five-year business plan. Sweeney began to audition and book commercial acting jobs in Seattle and Portland, Oregon, where the family temporarily resided, until choosing to relocate to Los Angeles, California, when she was 14 years old.

Career

2009–2019: Early work
Sweeney began her career as guest star in TV shows such as 90210, Criminal Minds, Grey's Anatomy and Pretty Little Liars.

Sweeney starred as Emaline Addario on the Netflix series Everything Sucks!, which revolved around two groups of high school students in Oregon in 1996. She then appeared in the HBO miniseries Sharp Objects, recurring as Alice, a roommate whom Amy Adams's character meets at a psychiatric facility. Her character was originally supposed to have a smaller role, but the director kept bringing her in for more scenes. For the role, Sweeney studied stories of girls who suffered from mental illness and self-harming, and visited hospitals who had patients who self-harmed. She filmed Everything Sucks! and Sharp Objects concurrently, the former during the week and latter on weekends.

Sweeney had a role in the thriller film Under the Silver Lake in 2018. She had a recurring role during the second season of the dystopian drama series The Handmaid's Tale as Eden Spencer, a pious and obedient girl from the totalitarian Republic of Gilead. She also starred as the heroine in the horror film Along Came the Devil. The next year, Sweeney appeared in the drama film Clementine, the coming-of-age film Big Time Adolescence, and Quentin Tarantino's dramedy Once Upon a Time in Hollywood.

2019present: Breakthrough and mainstream recognition

In June 2019, Sweeney began portraying teenager Cassie Howard, a teenager with a promiscuous reputation, in the HBO drama series Euphoria, to widespread acclaim, receiving a nomination for the Primetime Emmy Award for Outstanding Supporting Actress in a Drama Series in 2022. She starred in the TV film Nocturne in 2020. She launched her production company, Fifty-Fifty Films, that same year. In 2021, Sweeney appeared in the first season of Mike White's anthology black comedy series The White Lotus, as a sardonic college sophomore, receiving critical acclaim for the role. For her portrayal of the character, she was nominated for the Primetime Emmy Award for Outstanding Supporting Actress in a Limited or Anthology Series or Movie in 2022. Her accomplishments earned her a place on the Time 100 Next list for 2022.

In 2023, Sweeney starred in Tina Satter's thriller drama Reality, which premiered at the 73rd Berlin Film Festival, where she received critical praise for her performance; Steph Green of IndieWire stated: "Not only is Reality inventively mounted and extraordinarily tense, but across 85 taut minutes, it proves something we already knew deep down: that Sydney Sweeney is the real deal". Jessica Kiang of Variety wrote "One major, electrifying connection between the facts of the case and their dramatization is provided by a revelatory Sydney Sweeney, playing Winner so convincingly that it’s hard to remember her as the sardonic, pampered teen in The White Lotus, or the nice-girl-turned-nasty in Euphoria". Charles Bramesco of The Playlist commented “Ultimately, it’s Sweeney’s show, and she excels in locating small crannies of tacit detail within these offhanded lines”.

Sweeney next had a role in the crime thriller Americana, which premiered at the South by Southwest Festival (SXSW) on March 17, 2023. 

Sweeney is set to star in the superhero film Madame Web, set in the Sony's Spider-Man Universe (SSU) franchise. She is also committed to star and executive produce a remake of 1968 film Barbarella. On March 8, it was announced that Sweeney would star in Apple Original Films' Echo Valley alongside Julianne Moore.

Personal life 
Sweeney has been engaged to her longtime boyfriend, Chicago-based restaurateur Jonathan Davino, since February 2022. Davino's family operates the city’s storied pizza restaurant Pompei, which opened in Chicago in 1909.

Sweeney has trained in mixed martial arts since she was 12 years old, and competed in grappling in high school. Sweeney owns a 1969 Ford Bronco, whose restoration she showed in detail on her TikTok account.

Filmography

Film

Television

Web

Music video

Awards and nominations

References

External links
 

1997 births
Living people
Actresses from Idaho
Actresses from Spokane, Washington
Actresses from Washington (state)
American child actresses
American film actresses
American television actresses
American voice actresses
People from Spokane, Washington
21st-century American actresses